Ocrisiodes babaella is a species of snout moth in the genus Ocrisiodes. It was described by Hans Georg Amsel in 1970 and is found in Afghanistan.

References

Moths described in 1970
Phycitinae
Taxa named by Hans Georg Amsel